The Temple of All Religions or the Universal Temple is an architectural complex in the Staroye Arakchino Microdistrict of Kazan, Russia. It consists of several types of religious architecture including an Orthodox church, a mosque, and a synagogue, among others. It is currently under construction since 1992, started by local artist and philanthropist Ildar Khanov (1940 - 2013). The structure now serves as a cultural center and a residence for Khanov's brother and sister, who both continue to serve as guides and supervisors of the complex.

Khanov was known for his efforts in the treatment of alcoholism, drug addiction, and various other addictions. His patients helped him to maintain and develop the Temple, either by direct involvement in the construction work or through sponsorship.

The structure is not an active temple of any religion, but rather, as Khanov described its mission, a "temple of culture and truth". It has become a popular landmark in the city of Kazan, which takes pride in the peaceful combination of different cultures (Islamic Tatar culture, Orthodox Russian, and others). The Temple is often visited by local and overseas tourists.

Khanov said that eventually the structure should have 16 cupolas, corresponding to the 16 major world religions, including past religions that are no longer practiced.

Gallery

References

External links 

 For Eleven Years Long, the Tatar Healer Ildar Khanov Builds His Temple of All Religions 
 Temple of All Religions at the Kazan city tourist portal
 Res Obscura : Ildar Khanov's All Religions Temple in Kazan
 Le temple de toutes les religions sur Chakipet 

Tatarstan
Buildings and structures in Kazan
Religion in Kazan
Interfaith dialogue
Religious buildings and structures in Russia
Tourist attractions in Tatarstan
Christian–Islamic–Jewish interfaith dialogue
Visionary environments